Vladimir Vladimirovich Presnyakov (born 29 March 1968) is a Soviet and Russian singer, musician, keyboardist, composer, arranger, and actor.

Winner of the Golden Gramophone Award.

Since 1987 to 1994 he worked in the theater songs of Alla Pugacheva.

Biography

Early life
Vladimir Vladimirovich Presnyakov was born in Sverdlovsk (now Yekaterinburg) on March 29, 1968 in the family of musicians Vladimir Petrovich and Elena Petrovna Presnyakov, future soloists of the VIA Samotsvety.

In 1979 he composed his first song, from 1980 he sang in the choir of the Yelokhovo Cathedral in Moscow, at 1981 performed with the group Cruise, performing his own songs "The Old Tale", "Red Book", "The Cat". His solo career began when he was 15 years old, at Laima Vaikule's restaurant variety show. He studied at the Choral College named after Sveshnikov, but was expelled from the college for objectionable behavior in 1982. Later he studied at the conductor-choir department of the School named after the October Revolution. In 1983 he had a case of pneumonia and lost his voice. When he recovered, his voice became a falsetto.

Career
Presnyakov performed songs in many movies. The musical film Higher Than Rainbow (1986) brought Presnyakov popularity — he sang the songs of the protagonist and had an episodic role in the picture. The songs "Zurbagan" and "The Roadside Grass is Sleeping" became hits. He also acted in the film She with a Broom, He in a Black Hat (1987) and performed several songs in the picture Island of Lost Ships (1989).

In 1989, Vladimir Presnyakov's debut album, "Dad, You Were Like That" was released, which formed the image of the singer. In the same year, Vladimir Presnyakov took part in the first Russian rock musical "Street". In the annual TASS hit list of that year he took 4th place in the solo performer category, with 12 995 votes. His song "Touch-Me-Not" in the same hit parade took 17th place (2257 votes).

With the solo concert program "The Vladimir Presnyakov Show" the musician successfully performed in the biggest concert halls of Moscow and Leningrad - Olympic Stadium and Yubileyny Sports Palace. Vladimir Presnyakov became the first Russian artist to receive the "Golden Key" prize in Monte Carlo (Monaco) as an artist whose recordings were sold in Russia in the largest circulation. In the early 1990s, the artist formed the "Captain" and with a new program "Farewell to Childhood" successfully performed in Moscow, as well as in the cities of near and far abroad.

In 1991, Presnyakov released a double album "Love". In 1994, the album "Castle from the Rain" was released, which was a huge success: the songs "Stewardess by the name of Jeanne", "Girlfriend Masha" were hits. In 1995, at the studio "Union" three collections of Presnyakov's best songs came out at once: "Zurbagan", "Wanderer" and "Jeanne". The new concert program "Castle from the Rain" was introduced in 1995 and was awarded the "Zvezda" award in the nomination "Show of the Year at Concert Venues of Russia". In 1996, Presnyakov's album "Saliva" was released, in 1998 the disk "Live Collection" appeared, in 2001 - the album "The Open Door".

In 2002 Vladimir Presnyakov took part in the Channel One reality show Last Hero and became its winner. In the same year the new album "Love on AUDIO" was released. In 2005, the singer recorded a joint disc with the band Malyrija. In 2006, Vladimir Presnyakov, along with Leonid Agutin, released the song "Airports", which became a radio hit, and Presnyakov and Agutin received the Golden Gramophone Award for Best Male Duo and were nominated for the 2007 Muz-TV Award as the "Best Duet". In 2012, the album "Be a part of yours" was released, which the musician recorded together with Leonid Agutin, Angelika Varum and Natalia Podolskaya. In early 2013, Vladimir Presnyakov prepared a new concert program "A Bad Angel", which included both new and already well-known songs.

Personal life
He was divorced twice. He lived in a marriage with Kristina Orbakaite; in 1991 they welcomed their first child  Nikita. In 1996 they  separated. In 2001 Vladimir married fashion designer Yelena Lenskaya. In 2005 they were divorced. Since 2005 he has been living with singer Natalia Podolskaya, they married in 2010 and in June 2015 Natalia gave birth to baby boy Artemy. Their second son, Ivan, was born in October 2020.

Discography

EP

1989 —  You Say (Melodiya)

Albums

1989 —  Dad, You Were Like That (Melodiya)
1991 —  Love (Alt Records)
1993 —  Best Of Hits, compilation
1994 —  The Castle of the Rain (General Records)
1996 —  Zurbagan (Soyuz)
1996 —  The Wanderer (Soyuz)
1996 —  Zhanna (Soyuz)
1996 —  Saliva (Soyuz)
2001 —  The Open Door, Rain (Monolith)
2002 —  Love on Audio
2009 —  Malaria
2011 —  Unreal Love
2012 —  To be a Part of Yours (with Leonid Agutin, Anzhelika Varum and Natalia Podolskaya)
2020 —  Listening to the Silence (Velvet Music)

DVD
2001 —  Live Collection, concert, Moroz Records
2005 —  Love on VIDEO, clips. BS Graphics
2005 —  Back to the Future, concert. ICA Music

References

External links
 Official website
 

|- 
! colspan="3" style="background: cyan;" | World Music Awards
|-

|-

1968 births
Living people
Russian pop singers
Russian Orthodox Christians from Russia
Singers from Moscow
Musicians from Yekaterinburg
Soviet male singers
Russian composers
Russian male composers
Soviet male actors
Soviet male child actors
20th-century Russian male singers
20th-century Russian singers
Winners of the Golden Gramophone Award
21st-century Russian male singers
21st-century Russian singers